Muenz is a surname. Notable people with the surname include:

Richard Muenz (born 1948), American actor and baritone
Sigmund Muenz (1881–?), American athlete

See also
Munz